The 1996 Challenge Bell was a tennis tournament played on indoor carpet courts at the Club Avantage Multi-Sports in Quebec City in Canada that was part of Tier III of the 1996 WTA Tour. It was the 4th edition of the Challenge Bell, and was held from October 21 through October 27, 1996. Lisa Raymond won the singles title.

Finals

Singles

 Lisa Raymond defeated  Els Callens, 6–4, 6–4
It was Raymond's 2nd title of the year and the 5th of her career.

Doubles

 Debbie Graham /  Brenda Schultz-McCarthy defeated  Amy Frazier /  Kimberly Po, 6–1, 6–4
It was Graham's 2nd title of the year and the 4th of her career. It was Schultz-McCarthy's 6th title of the year and the 15th of her career.

References

External links
Official website

Challenge Bell
Tournoi de Québec
Challenge Bell
1990s in Quebec City